The Capt. George Lovell House is a historic house located in the Osterville section of Barnstable, Massachusetts.

Description and history 
It is a -story wood-frame house, five bays wide, with a hip roof, paired chimneys at the sides, and a hip roof. It was built in 1826, and was the home of a prominent local ship's captain. In 1925-26 the house received a major upgrade, which included the addition of the Greek four-column temple portico front, and other Colonial Revival styling.

The house was listed on the National Register of Historic Places on November 10, 1987.

See also
National Register of Historic Places listings in Barnstable County, Massachusetts

References

Houses in Barnstable, Massachusetts
National Register of Historic Places in Barnstable, Massachusetts
Houses on the National Register of Historic Places in Barnstable County, Massachusetts
Houses completed in 1826
Colonial Revival architecture in Massachusetts